The 2013 3 Hours of Zhuhai was the third round of the 2013 Asian Le Mans Series season. It took place on October 13, 2013, at the Zhuhai International Circuit in Zhuhai, China.

Race result
Race result is as follows. Class winners in bold.

References

External links
 

2013 Asian Le Mans Series season
2013 in Chinese motorsport